Senator Talbot may refer to:

Isham Talbot (1773–1837), U.S. Senator from Kentucky from 1815 to 1819; also served in the Kentucky State Senate
John C. Talbot (1784–1860), Maine State Senate
Matthew Talbot (1767–1827), Georgia State Senate
Ray Herbert Talbot (1896–1955), Colorado State Senate

See also
Albert G. Talbott (1808–1887), Kentucky State Senate